Adam Higginbotham (born 1968 in Somerset) is a British journalist who is the former U.S. correspondent for The Sunday Telegraph Magazine and former editor-in-chief of The Face. He has also served as a contributing writer for The New Yorker, Wired, and The New York Times.

Higginbotham is the author of Midnight in Chernobyl: The Untold Story of the World's Greatest Nuclear Disaster, published in 2019 by Simon & Schuster, which received the 2020 William E. Colby Award for Military and Intelligence Writing, the 2020 Andrew Carnegie Medal for Excellence in Non-Fiction, and was selected one of the 10 Best Books of 2019 by The New York Times.

References

1968 births
Living people
British journalists